Vakkantham Vamsi is an Indian screenwriter and director in Telugu cinema. His notable screenwriting credits include Kick (2009), Yevadu (2014), Race Gurram (2014), and Temper (2015).

Early life and career
He was born in Arikela village near Punganur in Chittoor district of Andhra Pradesh and graduated from Sri Venkateswara University. He continued his father's Vakkantham Suryanarayana Rao legacy in writings. He gained recognition for his language diction and acting skills during his schooling. Vamsi started his career as a News presenter, television anchor and starred as Suka Muni in Bapu – Ramana's tele serial Bhagavatham telecasted on ETV. He made his Telugu film debut with Kalyana Prapthirasthu opposite Suma, directed by Dasari Narayana Rao. After the release of his film Kick he became one of the popular writers of Telugu Cinema.

Filmography

References

External links

123telugu.com

Living people
Telugu screenwriters
Telugu film directors
People from Chittoor district
Sri Venkateswara University alumni
Film directors from Andhra Pradesh
21st-century Indian film directors
Screenwriters from Andhra Pradesh
Year of birth missing (living people)